John F. Link Jr., also known as John F. Link II or simply John F. Link, is an American film and television editor. He is most well known for his editing work on Die Hard, for which he was nominated for an Academy Award.

Life and career
His father, John F. Link Sr., was also a film editor, and was also nominated for an Academy Award: for the 1943 film, For Whom the Bell Tolls.  Link was one of several assistant editors on the film. That same year he was the sole editor on the documentary, Footprints on the Moon. Both the film and the documentary have his credit as John F. Link Jr., making attribution easy. His next project was another documentary, Say Goodbye in 1971, which was nominated for an Academy Award for Best Documentary (Feature). During the 1970s he worked in both television and film. Notable films he edited during this period include: The King of Marvin Gardens (1972), starring Jack Nicholson, Bruce Dern, and Ellen Burstyn; the 1973 cult classic Electra Glide in Blue (which he co-edited with two others); Race with the Devil (1975), starring Peter Fonda and Warren Oates; and the 1976 Jeff Bridges' comedy-drama film, Stay Hungry, which also starred Sally Field and Arnold Schwarzenegger.

In the 1980s, in addition to his Academy Award-nominated work on Die Hard, Link again worked on two Schwarzenegger films, 1985's Commando and  the 1987 blockbuster, Predator. Following these he worked on Die Hard, ending the decade with editing the 1989 cult classic, Road House. The 1990s dawned with Link working on the Steven Seagal action thriller Hard to Kill. This was followed by the action-comedy film If Looks Could Kill starring Richard Grieco. Other notable films he edited during the decade include The Hand That Rocks the Cradle, a psychological thriller starring Annabella Sciorra and Rebecca De Mornay; the Walt Disney production of Alexandre Dumas' classic novel, The Three Musketeers; the Keenen Ivory Wayans comedy, A Low Down Dirty Shame, with Charles S. Dutton and Jada Pinkett; another Disney Film, The Big Green in 1995 starring Olivia d'Abo and Steve Guttenberg; and the Jean-Claude Van Damme martial arts film, The Quest; and the superhero action film Steel, based upon the DC Comics character Steel, starring Shaquille O'Neal. The last film for which he received credit as an editor was 2000 slasher film, Cherry Falls, directed by Geoffrey Wright, and starring Brittany Murphy, Jay Mohr, and Michael Biehn.

Filmography
(as per AFI's database, unless otherwise footnoted)

 Footprints on the Moon – Apollo 11 (1969) (credited as John F. Link Jr.), editor
 Mackenna's Gold (1969) (credited as John F. Link Jr.), associate editor
 Say Goodbye, editor
 The King of Marvin Gardens (1972) (credited as John F. Link II), editor
 Electra Glide in Blue (1973) (credited as John F. Link II), editor
 Chosen Survivors (1974) (credited as John F. Link II), editor
 Race with the Devil (1975) (credited as John Link), editor
 Stay Hungry (1976) (credited as John F. Link II), editor
 Handle with Care (1977) (credited as John F. Link II), editor
 Charles Berlitz's The Bermuda Triangle (1979) (credited as John Link), editor
 Borderline (1980) (credited as John F. Link II), editor
 Commando (1985), editor 
 Predator (1987), editor 
 Die Hard (1988), editor	 
 Road House (1989), editor
 Hard to Kill (1990), editor
 If Looks Could Kill (1991), editor
 The Hand That Rocks the Cradle (1992), editor
 The Mighty Ducks (1992), editor
 The Three Musketeers (1993), editor
 D2: The Mighty Ducks (1994), editor
 A Low Down Dirty Shame (1994), editor
 The Big Green (1995), editor
 The Quest (1996), editor
 Steel (1997), editor
 Cherry Falls (2000), editor

References

External links
 

American film editors
Living people
Place of birth missing (living people)
Year of birth missing (living people)